Carbon disulfide (also spelled as carbon disulphide) is an inorganic compound with the chemical formula  and structure . It is a colorless liquid, which is used as a building block in organic synthesis. It has a pleasant, ether- or chloroform-like odor, but commercial samples are usually yellowish and are typically contaminated with foul-smelling impurities.

History 

In 1796, the German chemist Wilhelm August Lampadius (1772–1842) first prepared carbon disulfide by heating pyrite with moist charcoal. He called it "liquid sulfur" (flüssig Schwefel).  The composition of carbon disulfide was finally determined in 1813 by the team of the Swedish chemist Jöns Jacob Berzelius (1779–1848) and the Swiss-British chemist Alexander Marcet (1770–1822).  Their analysis was consistent with an empirical formula of CS2.

Occurrence, manufacture, properties
Small amounts of carbon disulfide are released by volcanic eruptions and marshes. CS2 once was manufactured by combining carbon (or coke) and sulfur at 800–1000 °C.
C + 2S → CS2

A lower-temperature reaction, requiring only 600 °C, utilizes natural gas as the carbon source in the presence of silica gel or alumina catalysts:
2 CH4 + S8 → 2 CS2 + 4 H2S

The reaction is analogous to the combustion of methane.

Global production/consumption of carbon disulfide is approximately one million tonnes, with China consuming 49%, followed by India at 13%, mostly for the production of rayon fiber. United States production in 2007 was 56,000 tonnes.

Solvent
Carbon disulfide is a solvent for phosphorus, sulfur, selenium, bromine, iodine, fats, resins, rubber, and asphalt.  It has been used in the purification of single-walled carbon nanotubes.

Reactions
Combustion of CS2 affords  sulfur dioxide according to this ideal stoichiometry:
CS2  +  3O2 → CO2  +  2SO2

With nucleophiles
For example, amines afford dithiocarbamates:
2R2NH + CS2 → [R2NH2+][R2NCS2−]
Xanthates form similarly from alkoxides:
RONa  +  CS2   →   [Na+][ROCS2−]
This reaction is the basis of the manufacture of regenerated cellulose, the main ingredient of viscose, rayon, and cellophane. Both xanthates and the related thioxanthates (derived from treatment of CS2 with sodium thiolates) are used as flotation agents in mineral processing.

Upon treatment with sodium sulfide, carbon disulfide affords trithiocarbonate:
Na2S  +  CS2   →  [Na+]2[CS32−]

Carbon disulfide does not hydrolyze readily, although the process is catalyzed by an enzyme carbon disulfide hydrolase.

Compared to the isoelectronic carbon dioxide, CS2 is a weaker electrophile. While, however, reactions of nucleophiles with CO2 are highly reversible and products are only isolated with very strong nucleophiles, the reactions with CS2 are thermodynamically more favored allowing the formation of products with less reactive nucleophiles.

Reduction
Reduction of carbon disulfide with sodium affords sodium 1,3-dithiole-2-thione-4,5-dithiolate together with sodium trithiocarbonate:
 4Na  +  4CS2   →   Na2C3S5  +   Na2CS3

Chlorination
Chlorination of CS2 provides a route to carbon tetrachloride:
CS2  +  3 Cl2   →   CCl4 + S2Cl2

This conversion proceeds via the intermediacy of thiophosgene, CSCl2.

Coordination chemistry
CS2 is a ligand for many metal complexes, forming pi complexes. One example is CpCo(η2-CS2)(PMe3).

Polymerization
CS2 polymerizes upon photolysis or under high pressure to give an insoluble material called car-sul or "Bridgman's black", named after the discoverer of the polymer, Percy Williams Bridgman. Trithiocarbonate (-S-C(S)-S-) linkages comprise, in part, the backbone of the polymer, which is a semiconductor.

Uses
The principal industrial uses of carbon disulfide, consuming 75% of the annual production, are the manufacture of viscose rayon and cellophane film.

It is also a valued intermediate in chemical synthesis of carbon tetrachloride.  It is widely used in the synthesis of organosulfur compounds such as xanthates, which are used in froth flotation, a method for extracting metals from their ores.  Carbon disulfide is also a precursor to dithiocarbamates, which are used as drugs (e.g. Metam sodium) and rubber chemistry.

Niche uses

It can be used in fumigation of airtight storage warehouses, airtight flat storage, bins, grain elevators, railroad box cars, ship holds, barges and cereal mills.  Carbon disulfide is also used as an insecticide for the fumigation of grains, nursery stock, in fresh fruit conservation and as a soil disinfectant against insects and nematodes.

Health effects
Carbon disulfide has been linked to both acute and chronic forms of poisoning, with a diverse range of symptoms.

Concentrations of 500–3000 mg/m3 cause acute and subacute poisoning. These include a set of mostly neurological and psychiatric symptoms, called encephalopathia sulfocarbonica. Symptoms include acute psychosis (manic delirium, hallucinations), paranoic ideas, loss of appetite, gastrointestinal and sexual disorders, polyneuritis, myopathy, and mood changes (including irritability and anger). Effects observed at lower concentrations include neurological problems (encephalopathy, psychomotor and psychological disturbances, polyneuritis, abnormalities in nerve conduction), vision problems (burning eyes, abnormal light reactions, increased ophthalmic pressure), heart problems (increased deaths for heart disease, angina pectoris, high blood pressure), and reproductive problems (increased miscarriages, immobile or deformed sperm), and decreased immune response.

Occupational exposure to carbon disulfide is also associated with cardiovascular disease, particularly stroke.

In 2000, the WHO believed that health harms were unlikely at levels below 100 μg/m3, and set this as a guideline level. Carbon sulfide can be smelled at levels above 200 μg/m3, and the WHO recommended a sensory guideline of below 20 μg/m3. Exposure to carbon disulfide is well-established to be harmful to health in concentrations at or above 30 mg/m3 Changes in the function of the central nervous system have been observed at concentrations of 20–25 mg/m3. There are also reports of harms to health at 10 mg/m3, for exposures of 10–15 years, but the lack of good data on past exposure levels make the association of these harms with concentrations of 10 mg/m3 findings uncertain. The measured concentration of 10 mg/m3 may be equivalent to a concentration in the general environment of 1 mg/m3.

Environmental sources
The primary source of carbon disulfide in the environment is rayon factories. Most global carbon disulfide emissions come from rayon production, as of 2008. Other sources include the production of cellophane, carbon tetrachloride, carbon black, and sulfur recovery. Carbon disulfide production also emits carbon disulfide.

, about 250 g of carbon disulfide is emitted per kilogram of rayon produced. About 30 g of carbon disulfide is emitted per kilogram of carbon black produced. About 0.341 g of carbon disulfide is emitted per kilogram of sulfur recovered.

Japan has reduced carbon disulfide emissions per kilogram of rayon produced, but in other rayon-producing countries, including China, emissions are assumed to be uncontrolled (based on global modelling and large-scale free-air concentration measurements). Rayon production is steady or decreasing except in China, where it is increasing, . Carbon black production in Japan and Korea uses incinerators to destroy about 99% of the carbon disulfide that would otherwise be emitted. When used as a solvent, Japanese emissions are about 40% of the carbon disulfide used; elsewhere, the average is about 80%.

Most rayon production uses carbon sulfide. One exception is rayon made using the lyocell process, which uses a different solvent;  the lyocell process is not widely used, because it is more expensive than the viscose process. Cuprammonium rayon also does not use carbon disulfide.

Historic and current exposure
Industrial workers working with carbon disulfide are at high risk. Emissions may also harm the health of people living near rayon plants.

Concerns about carbon disulfide exposure have a long history. Around 1900, carbon disulfide came to be widely used in the production of vulcanized rubber. The psychosis produced by high exposures was immediately apparent (it has been reported with 6 months of exposure). Sir Thomas Oliver told a story about  a rubber factory that put bars on its windows so that the workers would not jump out to their deaths. Carbon disulfide's use in the US as a heavier-than-air burrow poison for Richardson's ground squirrel also lead to reports of psychosis. No systematic medical study of the issue was published, and knowledge was not transferred to the rayon industry.

The first large epidemiological study of rayon workers was done in the US in the late 1930s, and found fairly severe effects in 30% of the workers. Data on increased risks of heart attacks and strokes came out in the 1960s. Courtaulds, a major rayon manufacturer, worked hard to prevent publication of this data in the UK. Average concentrations in sampled rayon plants were reduced from about 250 mg/m3 in 1955-1965 to about 20–30 mg/m3 in the 1980s (US figures only?). Rayon production has since largely moved to the developing world, especially China, Indonesia and India.

Rates of disability in modern factories are unknown, . Current manufacturers using the viscose process do not provide any information on harm to their workers.

See also
 Carbon monosulfide
 Carbon subsulfide
 Carbon diselenide
 1949 Holland Tunnel fire, accident with truck carrying carbon disulfide.

References

External links

Australian National Pollutant Inventory: Carbon disulfide
CDC - NIOSH Pocket Guide to Chemical Hazards - Carbon Disulfide
 Inno Motion Engineering
 Agency for Toxic Substances & Disease Registry Public Health Statement for Carbon Disulfide, 1996. 
 Resources on Carbon Disulfide by the National Institute for Occupational Safety and Health
 

Sulfides
Inorganic carbon compounds
Inorganic sulfur compounds
Inorganic solvents
Hazardous air pollutants
Neurotoxins
Dichalcogenides
Occupational safety and health
Foul-smelling chemicals
IV-VI semiconductors